Hanni Rehborn (20 November 1907 – 30 November 1987) was a German diver who competed in the 1928 Summer Olympics. She finished sixth in the 10 metre platform event. Her elder brother, Julius, was an Olympic diver and her sister, Anni, was an Olympic swimmer.

References

1907 births
1987 deaths
German female divers
Olympic divers of Germany
Divers at the 1928 Summer Olympics
20th-century German women